Far West is a comic book limited series created by Richard Moore and published by Antarctic Press. The setting is an industrial age Western-style secondary world full of creatures such as elves, dwarves, centaurs and other fantasy creatures.

Plot 
Meg, a half-elf gunslinger and her partner Phil, a talking grizzly bear. As bounty hunters, they are hired to capture an outlaw who uses a fire-breathing dragon to rob trains. They later come into conflict with a gang of ogres led by the notorious Moonshine Kid. In their latest (currently unpublished) adventure, they pursue a fugitive into the haunted Badlands and have to fight against an evil spirit called Kodiki who can transform himself into the physical manifestations of their worst fears.

Publication history 
The Far West storyline consisted of four issues published in Nov. 1998 – May 1999; a second volume consisting of two issues, published in Feb.–Apr. 2000; and a full-color one-shot published in 2008.

Collected editions 
 Far West (NBM Publishing, 2001)  — includes "Dragon Train" parts 1–4, "Hole in the Head Gang" parts 1 and 2, and a bonus story — "Pookah Party"
 Far West Pocket Manga Vol. 1 (Antarctic Press, 2008) 
 Far West: Badder Mojo (Antarctic Press, 2009) — includes "Bad Mojo" and "Badder Mojo". It was the first book of the series to be published in color.

Cast

Main characters
Ra'Meghan Val'Norium – Half elf, half Native American gunfighter who usually wears a breech cloth, assless chaps, and a bowler hat. 
Phil – Meg's sidekick who is a crackshot with a winchester rifle. Unlike the wild Meg who loves gambling, getting drunk and starting fights, Phil is more calm and restrained.

Villains
Darian Voss – Elf train-robber who lives in Troll country and is recognisable for his muttonchop sideburns and handlebar moustache.
Moonshine Kid – A bandit trapped in a child's body after drinking the elixir of life.
Hole-in-the Head Gang – The Kid's dim-witted ogre henchmen
High-Top – A snake oil salesman who tries to kill Meg after losing a game of poker. Meg kills him by poisoning his beer with a flesh-eating water demon.
Bellboy – A lecherous dwarf bribed by High-Top to put a water demon in Meg's bath.
Phooka – A goat faced goblin capable of changing his shape.
Sheetfire – A goblin who sold the dragon to Darian Voss.

Others
Cyrus Shaldak – Detective who leads the Blackhawk Posse.
Blackhawk Posse – A rival gang of bounty hunters who take the credit by bringing in Voss's body.
Blind Man – Insane hermit who tries to warn Meg about the dragons
Trolls – The equivalent of cowboys who wrangle fire-breathing dragons.

References

External links 
 
 Far West review by Amy Harlib
 Far West on Google Books

Elves in popular culture
Fantasy Westerns
Fantasy graphic novels